Treadwell is a hamlet located within the town of Franklin in Delaware County, New York,  United States. Treadwell was originally named Croton in the 19th century. Treadwell is located near Oneonta. Its ZIP code is 13846.

Notes

Hamlets in Delaware County, New York
Hamlets in New York (state)

Helga Sheck Treadwell ny13846 also try Hahns Sheck